aukro.bg was an online shopping platform operating on the Bulgarian market. The website makes it possible for users to sell and buy products and services in two ways – on a fixed-price basis and by participating in auction bids. The products and services presented at aukro.bg belong to different categories – fashion, cosmetics, art, books, PC- and home appliances, automobiles etc. -- all of them offered directly by sellers.
aukro.bg is managed by Aukro Bulgaria EOOD, part of MIH Allegro B.V (the first internet auction internet platform in Eastern Europe). MIH Allegro B.V is part of Naspers Group.

Aukro Bulgaria also was managing:
 Pazaruvaj.com – online product price comparison website

References

Online auction websites of Bulgaria
Economy of Sofia